Emanuele Dessì (born 30 March 1964) is an Italian politician who has served in the Senate of the Republic since 2018.

Political career 
Originally a member of the Five Star Movement, he left the party on 25 February 2021 due to disagreements with the Draghi government. On 11 November 2021 he joined the Communist Party.

See also 

 List of current Italian senators

References 

Living people
1964 births
Senators of Legislature XVIII of Italy
Five Star Movement politicians
Italian communists
21st-century Italian politicians
Università degli Studi Niccolò Cusano alumni
20th-century Italian people